Sierra de Algairén is a mountain range in Aragon, Spain, located between the comarcas of Campo de Cariñena and Comunidad de Calatayud. The ridge's highest summit is Pico de Valdemadera (1,276 m).

Description
The Algairén Mountains are covered with forest made up pine, Carrasca (Quercus ilex), cork oak, and also maple trees. They are a Special Protection Area for birds.

These mountains are part of the central area of the Iberian System and the summits are often covered with snow in the winter.

References

External links

 Tourism in Zaragoza - Sierra de Algairén 
 Sierra de Algairén y Pico del Águila 
Pico Valdemadera (1276 m) - Las sierras cercanas

Mountain ranges of Aragon
Algairen